Barbara Cook Green Swinton (born May 25, 1960) is a judge on the Oklahoma Court of Civil Appeals.  She was appointed to the appellate court by Governor Mary Fallin on September 14, 2016, to replace Judge Bill Hetherington, who retired from District Four, Office One on September 2, 2016.  Prior to her appointment, Judge Swinton served as district court judge for the 7th Judicial District, beginning in 2002.

Swinton was appointed as a special judge for Oklahoma County in 1996. Before that, she worked for a year as a trial lawyer with David W. Lee and Associates, handling family law and federal civil rights cases.

Her first professional job was with Riggs, Abney, Neal, Turpen, Orbison and Lewis, where she spent four years practicing general civil and family law.

Judge Swinton earned her bachelor's degree in political science with honors from Oklahoma State University and her J.D. in 1991 from Georgia State University College of Law.

Family
Swinton is married to Charles Swinton, senior vice president of public affairs and corporate trust at BancFirst. The couple has three adult children.

Notes

References 

1960 births
People from Oklahoma City
Living people
21st-century American judges
Oklahoma state court judges
Oklahoma State University alumni
Georgia State University College of Law alumni
21st-century American women judges